is a 1992 Japanese film directed by Hideyuki Hirayama.

Cast
 Kyozo Nagatsuka as Shuhei Mikami
 Tomoko Fujita as Junko Osanai
 Kazuhiko Kanayama as Yonekura
 Kei Tani as Ikuo Haruyama
 Jun Fubuki as Tsuneko Adachi
 Kirin Kiki as Yasuko Takeda

References

External links
 

1992 films
Films directed by Hideyuki Hirayama
1990s Japanese films